Natalia Rutkowska (born 21 January 1991) is a Polish track racing cyclist.

Career results

2011
3rd Team Sprint, UEC European U23 Track Championships (with Małgorzata Wojtyra)
2012
1st Scratch Race, UEC European U23 Track Championships
2013
Grand Prix Vienna
2nd Team Sprint (with Eugenia Bujak)
3rd Individual Pursuit
3rd Points Race
3rd Sprint
2nd Points Race, 6 giorni delle rose – Fiorenzuola (U23)
2014
3rd Points Race, Grand Prix of Poland
2015
1st Scratch Race, Panevėžys
Grand Prix Galichyna
3rd Omnium
3rd Points Race
2016
Grand Prix of Poland
1st Team Pursuit (with Edyta Jasińska, Katarzyna Pawłowska and Małgorzata Wojtyra)
3rd Points Race
Panevežys
1st Omnium
2nd Scratch Race
Grand Prix Galichyna
1st Points Race
1st Scratch Race
Grand Prix Minsk
2nd Omnium
2nd Scratch Race
3rd Points Race
2nd Scratch Race, GP Czech Cycling Federation

References

External links

1991 births
Polish track cyclists
Polish female cyclists
Living people
Sportspeople from Olsztyn
Olympic cyclists of Poland
Cyclists at the 2016 Summer Olympics
21st-century Polish women